Casa Rosa or Casa Rosada, also known as the Pink House, is a historic house located in Old San Juan, Puerto Rico. The house was built in 1812 as a barrack for the troops assigned to the San Agustin Bastion. It was converted to an officers quarters in 1881 by the Spanish Army. The building was later converted to a museum used for Puerto Rican crafts. Today it operates as a day care center for the children of employees of the Government of Puerto Rico.

References

External links
Note: Some links below are commercial links, but provide descriptions of the house.

Buildings and structures in San Juan, Puerto Rico
Houses in Puerto Rico
Old San Juan, Puerto Rico
Government buildings completed in 1812
Barracks in the United States
1812 establishments in Puerto Rico